Rok Roj (born 10 August 1986) is a Slovenian footballer who plays for Nasaf. He started his career in Maribor and later played for Malečnik, WAC St. Andrä, MU Šentjur, Olimpija, Rudar Velenje, Volendam and Zavrč.

Career
In February 2014, Roj signed a one-year contract with FC Taraz of the Kazakhstan Premier League, leaving them in December 2014 following the conclusion of his contract. In February 2015, Roj signed a one-year contract with Uzbek League side FC Nasaf.

References

External links
PrvaLiga profile 

1986 births
Living people
Sportspeople from Maribor
Slovenian footballers
Association football defenders
NK Maribor players
Slovenian expatriate footballers
Expatriate footballers in Austria
NK Olimpija Ljubljana (2005) players
Slovenian PrvaLiga players
NK Rudar Velenje players
Expatriate footballers in the Netherlands
FC Volendam players
Eerste Divisie players
NK Zavrč players
Expatriate footballers in Kazakhstan
FC Nasaf players
Expatriate footballers in Uzbekistan
FC Taraz players
Kazakhstan Premier League players